The men's sabre was one of eight fencing events on the fencing at the 1980 Summer Olympics programme. It was the nineteenth appearance of the event. The competition was held from 24 to 25 July 1980. 30 fencers from 12 nations competed. Nations had been limited to three fencers each since 1928. The event was won by defending champion Viktor Krovopuskov of the Soviet Union, the nation's third consecutive victory in the event (a streak that would be broken by the Soviet-led boycott four years later). Krovopuskov was the third man to successfully defend a sabre title and the 10th man to win two medals of any color in the event. His teammate Mikhail Burtsev took silver. Imre Gedővári's bronze medal returned Hungary to the podium after a one-Games absence broke an eleven-Games streak.

Background

This was the 19th appearance of the event, which is the only fencing event to have been held at every Summer Olympics. Five of the six finalists from 1976 returned: gold medalist Viktor Krovopuskov of the Soviet Union, silver medalist (and 1972 bronze medalist) Vladimir Nazlymov of the Soviet Union, fourth-place finisher Ioan Pop of Romania, fifth-place finisher Mario Aldo Montano of Italy, and sixth-place finisher Michele Maffei of Italy. Bronze medalist (and 1972 gold medalist) Viktor Sidyak's place on the Soviet team had been filled by Mikhail Burtsev. The three world championships since the last Games had been won by Hungarian Pál Gerevich (1977) and Soviets Krovopuskov (1978) and Nazlymov (1979), the latter of whom had also won in 1975. The American-led boycott had little effect on the top of the favorites list, with the Soviet Union dominating, other Eastern Bloc countries such as Hungary, Poland, Romania being perpetually strong (with Bulgarian twins Vasil Etropolski and Khristo Etropolski making a case to add that nation), and the strongest Western nation in the event (Italy) participating under the Olympic flag. Indeed, the only nation that had ever won a men's sabre medal to boycott the 1980 Games was the United States—which had taken silver in St. Louis 1904 by default, with only one Cuban fencer (who took gold) making the event international.

Kuwait and East Germany each made their debut in the men's sabre. Italy made its 17th appearance in the event, most of any nation, having missed the inaugural 1896 event and the 1904 St. Louis Games.

Competition format

The 1980 tournament continued to use a mix of pool and knockout rounds. The competition included two pool rounds, followed by a double-elimination knockout round, finishing with a final pool round. In each pool round, the fencers competed in a round-robin.

Bouts in the round-robin pools were to 5 touches; bouts in the double-elimination round were to 10 touches. Repechages were not used in the first two rounds, but were used to determine medalists if necessary in the final.

Schedule

All times are Moscow Time (UTC+3)

Results

Round 1

Round 1 Pool A

Round 1 Pool B

Round 1 Pool C

Round 1 Pool D

Round 1 Pool E

Round 1 Pool F

Round 2

Round 2 Pool A

Round 2 Pool B

Round 2 Pool C

Round 2 Pool D

Double elimination rounds

Winners brackets

Winners group 1

Winners group 2

Winners group 3

Winners group 4

Losers brackets

Losers group 1

Losers group 2

Final round 

 Barrage

Final classification

References

Sabre men
Men's events at the 1980 Summer Olympics